Bahzani, literally from the Syriac words meaning "House of treasure," is a town located in the Al-Hamdaniya District of the Ninawa Governorate in northern Iraq.

Population 
The town of Bahzani, together with Bashiqa, have historically hosted a diverse set of populations, however, the majority of the residents are reported to Yazidis. Apart from Yazidis, these populations include Assyrians, Shia Muslims, Sunni Muslims, and Shabaks. The Yazidis in Bahzani and its twin village Bashiqa speak Arabic as their mother language.

History 
Bahzani is official Iraqi territory but is claimed by the Kurdistan Region since the fall of Saddam Hussein in 2003. According to Article 140 of the Iraqi constitution, a referendum should decide whether it should continue to be managed by the central government or the KRG. The status of the city is still not fully understood. According to Human Rights Watch, UNHCR and other human rights organizations the townspeople are forced and threatened with violence if they should not vote for inclusion of the city in the Kurdistan Region.

The town's residents all fled for Iraqi Kurdistan following the invasion of the town by ISIS in August 2014. In late 2016 it was liberated along with its twin village Bashiqa. Many of its displaced residents have now returned and have rebuilt its Yazidi temples and its church.

Yazidi holy sites

Bahzani has numerous Yazidi shrines, including:

Shrine of Ebû Rîsh
Shrine of Sheikh Bako. The shrine is accompanied by a spring with a fig tree, which is visited by pilgrims with fevers. Pilgrims fasten small bits of their clothes on the tree and feed the fish in the spring.
Shrine of Sitt Hebîbe, also known as Marta Hebîbta ("the Beloved Lady"; the wife of Sheikh Muhemmed). She also has a shrine near Bashiqa.
Shrine of Mes'ûd
Shrine of Dayka Jakan

See also 
Assyrians in Iraq
Yazidis in Iraq
Bashiqa
Nineveh Plains

References 

Populated places in Nineveh Governorate
Assyrian communities in Iraq
Yazidi populated places in Iraq
Nineveh Plains